Turki or Torki bin Said al Busaidi, GCSI (1832 – 4 June 1888) was Sultan of Muscat and Oman from 30 January 1871 to 4 June 1888. He was the fifth son of Said bin Sultan. He acceded following his victory over his rival the Imam Azzan bin Qais at the Battle of Dhank. On Turki's death, he was succeeded by his second son, Faisal bin Turki.

Turki had five children:
 Sayyid Muhammad bin Turki al-Said (1860–?)
 Sayyid Faisal bin Turki al-Said (1864–1913)
 Sayyid Fahad bin Turki al-Said (?-1894)
 Sayyida Turkia bint Turki al-Said who married a cousin, Sultan Hamad bin Thuwaini Al-Said
 Sayyida (name unknown) bint Turki al-Said, who married Talal bin Abdullah Al Rashid, Emir of Jabal Shammar.

Honours
Knight Grand Commander of the Order of the Star of India (GCSI) – 1 January 1886

External links
Omani Ministry of Foreign Affairs

1832 births
1888 deaths
19th-century Arabs
19th-century Omani people
Al Said dynasty
Knights Grand Commander of the Order of the Star of India
Omani Ibadi Muslims
Sons of Omani sultans
Sultans of Oman